The Journal of Race Development was the first American academic journal of international relations. It was founded in 1910 by G. Stanley Hall along with George Hubbard Blakeslee, both of Clark University. Despite a name which now suggests a journal devoted to eugenics, the journal, in fact, dealt with a variety of topics connected with politics, foreign affairs and international relations. It was renamed the Journal of International Relations, which in turn was merged with Foreign Affairs in 1922.

Major articles 
The following are some of the articles published in The Journal of Race Development which are most commonly cited today.
Chamberlain, A. F., "The Contribution of the Negro to Human Civilization", Journal of Race Development, 1 (April 1911)
Du Bois, W.E.B., "Of the Culture of White Folk," Journal of Race Development (April 1917)
Huntington, Ellsworth, "The Adaptability of the White Man to Tropical America," Journal of Race Development (October 1914).
 McKenzie, Fayette Avery, "The American Indian of Today and Tomorrow," The Journal of Race Development, 3:2 (October 1912)
 Singh, Sander, "The Hindu in Canada," Journal of Race Development, 7 (1916–17), 361–382

References 

Publications established in 1911
International relations journals
Political magazines published in the United States
Publications established in 1910
Publications disestablished in 1919